Methone is a genus in the butterfly family Riodinidae present only in the Neotropical realm.

Taxonomy
The genus Methone is monotypic. The single species is Methone cecilia is unmistakably characterized by the conspicuous colouring and the deeply indented margin of the hindwing being continued in the female at the ends of the veins into teeth-like small tails. On the forewing the subcostal is four-branched; the branches 1 and 2 rise before, 3 and 4 behind the cell. The hindwing is without a basal vein. The palpi are extremely short.

The colouring resembles that of certain Themone, Cartea, Monethe, Aricoris which imitate butterflies such as Ithomiinae and pericopine moths. The females are very stout and clumsy which makes them still more similar to the unwieldy Actinote. They are quite common but they are local and seem not to leave their birthplace.

List of subspecies 
 M. c. cecilia present in Suriname and French Guiana
 M. c. chrysomela (Butler, 1872) present in Costa Rica, Panama and Colombia
 M. c. magnarea (Seitz, 1913) present in Brazil (Amazonas), Peru and Bolivia
 M. c. eurotias (Stichel, 1919) present in Ecuador
 M. c. caduca (Stichel, 1919) present in Costa Rica

References

Methone at Markku Savela's website on Lepidoptera

External links

Methone at Butterflies of America

Riodinidae
Riodinidae of South America
Lepidoptera of Bolivia
Lepidoptera of Brazil
Lepidoptera of Colombia
Butterflies of Central America
Lepidoptera of Ecuador
Lepidoptera of French Guiana
Lepidoptera of Peru
Fauna of Suriname
Fauna of the Amazon
Butterflies described in 1777
Taxa named by Edward Doubleday